X60 may refer to:

 Lifan X60, a 2011–present Chinese compact SUV
 SL X60, a commuter train used in Stockholm, Sweden
 ThinkPad X60, a series of laptops and tablets
 Saber Radar X60, an air defense radar unit developed by the Brazilian Army
 GOLauncher1, a small launch vehicle designated X-60 by the US Air Force
 Williston Municipal Airport, located in Williston, Florida, United States, IATA code X60
 Generation Orbit X-60,  an air-launched single stage suborbital rocket vehicle 
 X60, a bus route in Scotland operated under the Buchan Express brand